ZieZie (born 3 June 1998) is a British rapper and singer from Croydon, London. He is best known for his single "Fine Girl" released in 2018 and for being featured in Aitch's "Buss Down" in 2019.

Early life
ZieZie was born on 3 June 1998 to a Congolese family. He grew up in Chessington, later moving to Croydon, south London. At the age of 11, he was encouraged to join the school choir by his teachers, saying in an interview that it gave him the dream to be an actor or singer. His father passed away when he was 12. ZieZie started studying carpentry in college, but his mother had to leave to the Congo in order to care for his grandmother; this would result in him missing five months of college. As a result, he decided to drop out and focus on music.

Career
ZieZie's career started with "Shawty", which he released on SoundCloud in December 2016. In 2017, after "Shawty" gained some underground interest and with the success of "Mingle" and "Hello", he was signed to RCA Records. Working with producers Ill Blu, his break into the charts came with "Fine Girl", which premiered on GRM Daily in April 2018 and entered the UK Singles Chart in May 2018. "Fine Girl" peaked at number 30 and was certified platinum by the British Phonographic Industry in 2020. The song was also featured on Ministry of Sound's Love Island – The Pool Party and Now That's What I Call Music! 101. After being featured on Ill Blu's "Chop My Money" with Krept & Konan and Loski, he released his second solo single "Sensei" in December 2018.

ZieZie started 2019 with being featured on Canadian duo Banx & Ranx's single "Speaker" with Olivia Holt and on Ill Blu's "Go Time", (with Ay Em, Geko and C. Tangana), followed by his own single "Persian" in June. In September, he was featured on Aitch's successful single "Buss Down", which peaked at number 8 on the UK Singles Chart and was certified platinum in 2021. In December, Aitch and ZieZie performed "Buss Down" in Capital FM's 2019 Jingle Bell Ball concert at The O2. The collaboration led to ZieZie joining Aitch's UK tour; later that year, ZieZie featured Aitch on the single "French Kisses" and he continued to support Aitch in 2020. In July 2020, ZieZie was listed in the "Official Top 20 Afrobeats artists of the past 12 months" at number 6. Later that year, he released the single "Worth It" featuring S1mba and Stylo G, produced by Ambezza, with another video premiering on GRM Daily. He then released "Pamela" with Wauve and Stonebwoy, which was featured on Wavue's EP Shade, "Pattern Up" with Nat Slater and "Late Night Text" featuring Ms Banks and Kwengface.

In February 2021, ZieZie released the single "Blessed" which peaked at number 5 on the UK Afrobeats Singles Chart, ZieZie's highest peak on that chart. This was followed by "Flow", featuring American rapper King Critical, in May and "Different" in June, the latter charting at number 10 on the UK Afrobeats. In November 2021 ZieZie supported Lil Tjay on his UK tour.

ZieZie's return to the UK Singles Chart after almost two years came with the single "Glad U Came" by producer Liilz featuring ZieZie, which samples The Wanted's "Glad You Came". The song entered the chart in March 2022 and peaked at number 15. This was followed by being featured in Banx & Ranx's surprising remix of Sigala's "Melody", released in the same month.

Discography

Singles

As lead artist

As featured artist

Other guest appearances

References

1998 births
Living people
English male rappers
Rappers from London
British trap musicians
People from Croydon
Black British male rappers